Proverbs 19 is the nineteenth chapter of the Book of Proverbs in the Hebrew Bible or the Old Testament of the Christian Bible. The book is a compilation of several wisdom literature collections, with the heading in 1:1 may be intended to regard Solomon as the traditional author of the whole book, but the dates of the individual collections are difficult to determine, and the book probably obtained its final shape in the post-exilic period. This chapter is a part of the second collection of the book.

Text
The original text is written in Hebrew language. This chapter is divided into 29 verses.

Textual witnesses
Some early manuscripts containing the text of this chapter in Hebrew are of the Masoretic Text, which includes the Aleppo Codex (10th century), and Codex Leningradensis (1008).

There is also a translation into Koine Greek known as the Septuagint, made in the last few centuries BC. Extant ancient manuscripts of the Septuagint version include Codex Vaticanus (B; B; 4th century), Codex Sinaiticus (S; BHK: S; 4th century), and Codex Alexandrinus (A; A; 5th century).

Parashot
The parashah sections listed here are based on the Aleppo Codex. {P}: open parashah.
 {P} 19:10–29; 20:1–30; 21:1–30 {P} 21:31; 22:1–29 {P}

Analysis
This chapter belongs to a section regarded as the second collection in the book of Proverbs (comprising Proverbs 10:1–22:16), also called "The First 'Solomonic' Collection" (the second one in Proverbs 25:1–29:27). The collection contains 375 sayings, each of which consists of two parallel phrases, except for Proverbs 19:7 which consists of three parts.

Verse 1
’’Better is the poor who walks in his integritythan he who is perverse in his lips and is a fool."Fool": following Masoretic Text and Septuagint, whereas the Syriac and Targum read “rich”. The Hebrew phrase construction uses , vehuʾ, "and he [is]," before the word "fool", so it may be rendered "one who is perverse while a fool" or "a fool at the same time." This verse is almost identical with verse 28:6, which contrasts the poor with the rich.  A poor person who has maintained his integrity is better off compared to the fool who lied and cheated his way to success (cf. Proverbs 16:8). The second line of verse 22 makes a similar contrast between the poor and the liar, but the connection to its first line is uncertain.

Verse 7All the brothers of the poor hate him;how much more do his friends go far from him!He pursues them with words, yet they abandon him. 
"Hate him" translated from the verb , saneʾ, which may be rendered as "reject" or "shunned" (NIV), basically 'to have nothing to do with him'. If relatives do this, how much more will the poor person's friends do so. Whereas wealth attracts friends, poverty repels them (cf. verse 4; Proverbs 14:20), and while the relatives of the poor may have little choice but to support, friends and neighbours will try to avoid them (verse 7a).
Among 375 "proverbs of Solomon" in Proverbs 10:1–22:16, only this one has three lines instead of two lines.

Verse 21There are many plans in a man’s heart,Nevertheless the Lord’s counsel—that will stand."Plans": from the Hebrew verb , khashav'', "to think; to reckon; to devise", which are many in human heart, but only those approved by God will succeed.

See also

Related Bible parts: Proverbs 9, Proverbs 18, Proverbs 22, Proverbs 23

Notes

References

Sources

External links
 Jewish translations:
 Mishlei - Proverbs - Chapter 19 (Judaica Press) translation [with Rashi's commentary] at Chabad.org
 Christian translations:
 Online Bible at GospelHall.org (ESV, KJV, Darby, American Standard Version, Bible in Basic English)
 Book of Proverbs Chapter 19 King James Version
  Various versions

19